Ferfried Maximilian Pius Meinrad Maria Hubert Michael Justinus Prinz von Hohenzollern (14 April 1943 – 27 September 2022) was a member of the princely House of Hohenzollern-Sigmaringen and champion race car driver. He was also known as the "black sheep" of Hohenzollern after several divorces and alcoholism including binge drinking scandals.

Early life
Ferfried was the youngest child and fourth son of Frederick, Prince of Hohenzollern and his wife Margarete Karola, daughter of the last Saxon king, Frederick Augustus III. The Swabian Hohenzollerns were elevated to princes in 1623 and ruled until 1849. Pope Pius XII was Ferfried's godfather.

Career

In 1971 Ferfried won the second 24-hour race at Nürburgring in Germany with a BMW 1600 Alpina. After 36 years of absence from active racing, he raced again for the private racing team Racing Strip.com live in 2007, again in a BMW.

Marriages and children
His first marriage, on 21 September 1968, was to Angela von Morgen (11 November 1942 – 11 January 2019), daughter of Ernst von Morgen and Countess Margarethe von Schlitz gen. von Görtz. They were divorced in 1973, having had two daughters:
Valerie Alexandra Henriette Margarethe (born 10 April 1969) 
Stefanie Michaela Sigrid Birgitta (born 8 May 1971)

His second marriage, on 7 April 1977, was to Eliane Etter (born 4 May 1947), daughter of Dr. Hans Etter and Irmgard Zosso. They were divorced in 1987, having had two children:
Henriette Annabelle Gabriele Adrienne (born 26 March 1978) 
Moritz Johannes Axel Peter Meinrad (born 5 May 1980)

In 1999 he married Maja Synke Meinert (born 8 October 1971). They were divorced in early March 2007.

Ferfried's three marriages were morganatic, although the first marriage to Angela von Morgen in 1968 (sister of Erika von Morgen, wife of Carl-Philip, Prince of Salm-Salm) was to a member of Germany's historical nobility, albeit untitled.

In the media
Beginning 8 May 2006 the reality programme Tatjana & Foffi – Cinderella Becomes A Princess was broadcast on television, focusing on Ferfried's former relationship with Tatjana Gsell. He appeared on TV Gusto's Royal Dinner, co-hosting alongside Birte Karalus.

Auto racing results

1968 
 24 March 1968, 4 h Monza (Italy; Div.2+3), Porsche 911, 2nd
 25 April 1968, 1000 km Monza, Porsche 911 T, DNF
 16 June 1968, Hockenheim Grand Touring (Germany), Porsche 911 T, 1st
 23 June 1968, Deutsche-Automobil-Rundstrecken-Meisterschaft Mainz-Finthen (Germany), Porsche 911 T, 1st
 7 July 1968, 6 h Nürburgring (Germany), Porsche 911, DNF
 21 July 1968, Solituderennen Hockenheim (Germany; GT+TS), Porsche 911 T, 1st
 18 August 1968, Grand Prix Brno (Czechoslovakia), Porsche 911, 3rd
 8 September 1968, Deutsche-Automobil-Rundstrecken-Meisterschaft Ulm-Laupheim, Porsche 911 T, 3rd
 1 December 1968, Hockenheim Finale, Porsche 911 T

1969 
 13 April 1969, ETCC Aspern (Div.1+2), BMW 1600
 20 April 1969, 1 h Belgrade (Div.2+3), BMW 1600, 7th
 25 April 1969, 1000 km Monza, Porsche 911 T, DNF
 4 May 1969, Targa Florio, Porsche 911 T, 48th
 4 May 1969, Targa Florio, Porsche 911 S, T-car
 11 May 1969, 2 h Budapest (Hungary), BMW 1600
 25 May 1969, GP Brno, BMW 1600, 3rd
 25 May 1969, GP Brno, BMW 1600
 1 June 1969, 1000 km Nürburgring, Porsche 911 T, DNF
 22 June 1969, 6 h Brands Hatch, BMW 1600, DNS
 6 July 1969, 6 h Nürburgring, BMW 1600, 4th
 27 July 1969, 24 h Spa, BMW 1600, DNA
 27 July 1969, 24 h Spa, BMW 1600, DNF
 10 August 1969, 1000 km Zeltweg, Porsche 910, 14th
 31 August 1969, ETCC Zandvoort (Div.2), BMW 1600, 4th
 28 September 1969, 3 h Jarama, BMW 1600, 5th
 12 October 1969, 1000 km Paris (France), Porsche 910, 7th
 19 October 1969, Hessenpreis Hockenheim (GT+1.6), Porsche 911 T, 7th
 1969, Tourenwagen-Europameisterschaft Division 2, BMW 1600, 3rd

1970 
 15 March 1970, 4 h Monza (Div.2+3), BMW 1600, DNF
 24 May 1970, GP Brno, BMW 1602, DNF
 14 June 1970, DARM Hockenheim (GT+1.3), Porsche, DNA
 5 July 1970, Hockenheim (GT+1.6/T+2.0), Porsche 911 T, 12th
 12 July 1970, GP Nürburgring, BMW 1602, DNF
 26 July 1970, 24 h Spa, BMW 1600, DNF
 27 September 1970, 4 h Jarama, BMW 1600, DNF
 11 October 1970, 1000 km Zeltweg, Porsche 914, 12th

1971 
 14 March 1971, 4 h Monza, BMW 2002, 6th
 11 April 1971, ETCC Salzburgring (Div.2), BMW 2002, DNF
 16 May 1971, Targa Florio, Porsche 914, 13th
 30 May 1971, 1000 km Nürburgring, Porsche 908/02, DNS
 27 June 1971, 24 h Nürburgring (Nordschleife), BMW 2002, 1st
 25 July 1971, 24 h Spa, BMW 2002, DNA
 11 September 1971, 12 h Paul Ricard, BMW 2002, DNF

2007 
 10 June 2007, 24 h Nürburgring, BMW M3 Compact

Ancestry

References 
Translator's note: These are in German.

External links 

Official site of the princely House of Hohenzollern-Sigmaringen (German)

1943 births
2022 deaths
House of Hohenzollern-Sigmaringen
Ferfried
People from Breisgau-Hochschwarzwald
Pope Pius XII
German rally drivers
Nürburgring 24 Hours drivers
Racing drivers from Baden-Württemberg